This is a list of people who have served as Lord Lieutenant of Fife.

Colin Lindsay, 3rd Earl of Balcarres 1688 – ?
John Leslie, 10th Earl of Rothes 1746 – ?
George Lindsay-Crawford, 22nd Earl of Crawford 17 March 1794 – 1807
Thomas Bruce, 7th Earl of Elgin 7 March 1807 – 1807
George Lindsay-Crawford, 22nd Earl of Crawford 20 May 1807 – 30 June 1808
George Douglas, 16th Earl of Morton 18 July 1808 – 1824
Thomas Erskine, 9th Earl of Kellie 11 June 1824 – 6 February 1828
James St Clair-Erskine, 2nd Earl of Rosslyn 23 February 1828 – 18 January 1837
Robert Ferguson 14 February 1837 – 3 December 1840
Captain James Erskine Wemyss RN 17 December 1840 – 3 April 1854
James Bruce, 8th Earl of Elgin 22 April 1854 – 20 November 1863
James Hay Erskine Wemyss 30 January 1864 – 29 March 1864
Sir Robert Anstruther, 5th Baronet 11 June 1864 – 21 April 1886
Victor Alexander Bruce, 9th Earl of Elgin 5 August 1886 – 18 January 1917
Sir William Robertson 21 May 1917 – 27 February 1923
Sir Ralph Anstruther, 6th Baronet 29 March 1923 – 30 September 1934
Edward James Bruce, 10th Earl of Elgin 5 January 1935 – 1965
Sir John McWilliam 20 January 1965 – 7 August 1974
William Anstruther-Gray, Baron Kilmany 1 January 1975 – 1980
Sir John Gilmour, 3rd Baronet 28 February 1980 – 1987
Andrew Bruce, 11th Earl of Elgin 11 December 1987 – 1999
Margaret Dean 13 September 1999 – 2015
Robert William Balfour 22 January 2015– present

Deputy lieutenants
A deputy lieutenant of Fife is commissioned by the Lord Lieutenant of Fife. Deputy lieutenants support the work of the lord-lieutenant. There can be several deputy lieutenants at any time, depending on the population of the county. Their appointment does not terminate with the changing of the lord-lieutenant, but they usually retire at age 75.

19th Century
5 March 1831: Lord William Robert Keith Douglas
5 March 1831: Lieutenant General Alexander Bethune
5 March 1831: Francis Balfour, Esq.
5 March 1831: Onesiphorus Tyndal Bruce, Esq.
5 March 1831: David Wemyss, Esq.
5 March 1831: John Fergus, Esq.
5 March 1831: .Lieutenant-Colonel Thomas Webster
5 March 1831: Robert Douglas, Esq.
5 March 1831: The Hon. John Stuart
5 March 1831: Rear Admiral Sir Frederick Lewis Maitland

References

Fife
 
Fife